Arno Zude (born 14 May 1964) is a German chess International Master and chess problemist.

Biography
Zude has won the German Chess Solving Championship several times (1983, 1985, 1986, 1988, 1989, 1990, 1991, 1992, 1993, 1994, 1998, 1999, 2001, 2007, and 2013). In 1993 Zude gained the title of International Solving Grandmaster. In 1994 he won the individual World Chess Solving Championship in Belfort.

Zude is a three-time winner of the Hesse federal state chess championship (1986, 1992, and 1994). In the 1995 German Chess Championship he finished in second place (behind Christopher Lutz). In 1995 Zude became a FIDE International Master. He regularly participated in the German Chess Bundesliga, which represented the SV Hofheim (with interruptions from 1984 to 2005) and PSV Duisburg (1997–2000) teams.

For his achievements in chess, on 7 December 2005 Zude received the highest sports award in Germany: Silbernes Lorbeerblatt.

References

External links

 player profile at chess-db.com
 Problems at the PDB-Server

1964 births
Living people
German chess players
Chess composers
International solving grandmasters
Chess International Masters